Jakigur is a town in Sistan and Baluchestan Province of Iran. It is located at 26°7'38N 61°30'32E and has an altitude of 337 metres (1108 feet).

References

Populated places in Sistan and Baluchestan Province